The 1788–89 United States presidential election in Pennsylvania took place on January 7, 1789, as part of the 1788–89 United States presidential election to elect the first President. Voters chose 10 representatives, or electors to the Electoral College, who voted for President and Vice President.

Pennsylvania unanimously voted for nonpartisan candidate and commander-in-chief of the Continental Army, George Washington. The total vote is composed of 6,711 for Federalist electors and 672 for Anti-Federalist electors, all of whom were supportive of Washington.

Results

See also
 List of United States presidential elections in Pennsylvania

References

Pennsylvania
1789
1789 Pennsylvania elections